Marmul is a small district, located in the central part of Balkh province in northern Afghanistan. The capital Marmul (also Marmol) is in its southern end on the border with the Chahar Kint district.

References

Districts of Balkh Province